Marcel Correia (born 16 May 1989) is a Portuguese professional footballer who plays as a centre back for  club SV Elversberg.

Early life and career
Correia was born to Portuguese parents in Kaiserslautern, but does not hold German citizenship. In 1995, he joined the youth system of his hometown club 1. FC Kaiserslautern and was promoted to the club's reserve side in 2008.

In 2011, Correia transferred to 2. Bundesliga side Eintracht Braunschweig. At the end of the 2016–17 season and after two years of captaining the team, he was released by Braunschweig. In this time there, he made 19 Bundesliga and 94 2. Bundesliga appearances.

In June 2017, Correia returned to his boyhood club 1. FC Kaiserslautern, also of the 2. Bundesliga, signing a three-year contract. Due to Kaiserslautern's relegation to the 3. Liga at the end of the 2017–18 season, he became a free agent and joined SSV Jahn Regensburg.

For the 2022–23 season, Correia signed with SV Elversberg.

Career statistics

Notes

References

External links
 
 

1989 births
Living people
People from Kaiserslautern
Footballers from Rhineland-Palatinate
Portuguese footballers
Portuguese expatriate footballers
Expatriate footballers in Germany
Portuguese expatriate sportspeople in Germany
Association football defenders
1. FC Kaiserslautern II players
Eintracht Braunschweig players
Eintracht Braunschweig II players
SSV Jahn Regensburg players
SC Paderborn 07 players
SV Elversberg players
Bundesliga players
2. Bundesliga players
Regionalliga players
3. Liga players
German people of Portuguese descent